Frontier Feud is a 1945 American Western film directed by Lambert Hillyer and written by Adele Buffington. This is the eighteenth film in the "Marshal Nevada Jack McKenzie" series, and stars Johnny Mack Brown as Jack McKenzie and Raymond Hatton as his sidekick Sandy Hopkins, with Dennis Moore, Christine McIntyre, Jack Ingram and Eddie Parker. The film was released on November 24, 1945, by Monogram Pictures.

Cast           
Johnny Mack Brown as Nevada Jack McKenzie
Raymond Hatton as Sandy Hopkins
Dennis Moore as Joe Davis
Christine McIntyre as Blanche Corey
Jack Ingram as Don Graham
Eddie Parker as Sam Murphy 
Frank LaRue as Chalmers
Steve Clark as Bill Corey
Jack Rockwell as Sheriff Clancy
Mary MacLaren as Sarah Moran
Edmund Cobb as Moran
Lloyd Ingraham as Si Peters
Ted Mapes as Slade Burnett

References

External links

American Western (genre) films
1945 Western (genre) films
Monogram Pictures films
Films directed by Lambert Hillyer
American black-and-white films
1940s American films
1940s English-language films